Queen of Sin may refer to:

 Queen of Sin and the Spectacle of Sodom and Gomorrha, a version of the title for Sodom and Gomorrah (1922 film)
 An image of Emma Peel and a scene from A Touch of Brimstone (from The Avengers TV series)
Maria Gertrudis Barceló, known as the Mexican "Queen of Sin"